Rosário Oeste is a municipality in the state of Mato Grosso in the Central-West Region of Brazil.

The municipality contains part of the  Águas do Cuiabá Ecological Station, a fully protected conservation unit in the cerrado biome.

See also
List of municipalities in Mato Grosso

References

Municipalities in Mato Grosso